The Steel Pier is a 1,000-foot-long amusement park built on a pier of the boardwalk in Atlantic City, New Jersey, across from the Hard Rock Hotel & Casino Atlantic City (formerly the Trump Taj Mahal). Begun in 1898, it was one of the most popular venues in the United States for the first seven decades of the twentieth century, featuring concerts, exhibits, and an amusement park.  It billed itself as the Showplace of the Nation and at its peak measured .

The pier is owned by the Catanoso Family and operates under the Steel Pier Associates, LLC name. The Catanosos had previously leased the pier to operate the amusement park before they purchased it. The Steel Pier continues to operate as an amusement pier and is one of the most successful family-oriented attractions in the city.

History

The pier was built by the Steel Pier Company and opened on June 18, 1898.  It was built on iron pilings, using a concrete understructure with steel girders.  In 1904, a storm washed away part of Steel Pier, and many engineers stated that it could not be rebuilt. Atlantic City's future mayor, Edward L. Bader, and his company accepted the challenge to rebuild it. His success with that job led to more work for him in Atlantic City.

In 1924, a fire caused significant damage to the pier.  Frank Gravatt purchased the pier the following year and renovated it.  He was called the "salt water Barnum" by the local newspaper.  The restored pier hosted dance bands, three movie theaters, exhibits, operas, children's shows, a water circus, stunts, and other attractions.  Gravatt signed John Philip Sousa for a series of annual concerts.  The General Motors Exhibit opened in 1926 and continued through 1933, when it was replaced by Ford.  (General Motors returned in 1947 and continued until 1968.)  From 1935 through 1938, the Steel Pier was where Miss America was crowned. It was described as "An Amusement City at Sea" and "A Vacation in Itself."  It also was once called the "Showplace of the Nation" and included such acts as the High Diving horse; Rex the Wonder Dog, the Human Cannonball, a water-skiing canine in the 1930s; the diving bell; and musicians, including Frank Sinatra and Al Jolson, among others. Diana Ross and The Supremes played week-long engagements during the summer in 1965, 1966, and 1967, to sold-out business in the Steel Pier's Music Hall Theater and the Marine Ballroom. "Rain or Shine ... There's Always a Good Show on Steel Pier" was another phrase used to describe the venue's varied entertainment.

In 1945, the pier was purchased by George Hamid, who operated the competing Million Dollar Pier.  He brought popular and rock and roll music to the pier, starting with Bill Haley and the Comets in 1955.  Parts of the pier were damaged or lost during the Ash Wednesday Storm of 1962.  The Beatles were booked in 1964, but overwhelming demand for tickets forced them to move to Boardwalk Hall.  The pier used to be much longer, but a December 1969 fire six months before the opening of the 1970 season shortened its size by about a third.

By the end of the 1960s, the pier was feeling the effects of declining tourism in Atlantic City. The pier was sold to a group of local businessmen in 1973. After gambling was legalized, a developer proposed turning the pier into a hotel-casino. However, the necessary governmental approvals could not be obtained, and the pier was sold to Resorts International in 1978, which mainly used the pier for storage. The original wooden pier with steel underpinnings was destroyed in a 1982 fire; the current concrete structure dates from 1993. Trump Entertainment acquired ownership of the pier when it acquired the Trump Taj Mahal in the late 1980s. The Steel Pier continues to operate as an amusement park to this day.

In June 2008, the Steel Pier celebrated its 110th anniversary, having originally opened on Saturday, June 18, 1898.

In February 2012, it was announced that a diving horse act would return to the Steel Pier as part of the recently approved Tourism Master Plan, but the plan was soon scrapped after public outcry.

In 2017, a newer and bigger giant Ferris wheel was added to the pier.

In popular culture

In films
 Wild Hearts Can't Be Broken (1991) - a Walt Disney film about the life of one of the riders of the diving horses.
 Convention Girl (1935) - featuring Shemp Howard of the Three Stooges, partly filmed on the Steel Pier.
 Three Stooges at Steel Pier (1938) - mini-short in rare color of the Three Stooges.
 The Burglar (1957) - featuring Jayne Mansfield, partly filmed on the Steel Pier.
 Atlantic City (1980 film) - featuring Burt Lancaster and Susan Sarandon; shows the Steel Pier in the background in one scene.

In music
"Steel Pier" - sung by Bobby Rydell on a 1963 promotional single.

"Amusement Parks U.S.A." - sung by the Beach Boys, references the Steel Pier, along with many other American amusement parks

In theater
Steel Pier musical (1997) - set at Steel Pier during the 1930s.  The plot centers around a dance marathon; however, dance marathons were featured instead at the Million Dollar Pier, not the Steel Pier.

See also

A Girl and Five Brave Horses
Diving horse
Sonora Webster Carver
William Frank Carver

References

Bibliography

External links

"Steel Pier Chronology"

Video 

 "Home video of Steel Pier Diving Bell taken in the 1960s"
 "Home video of Steel Pier Diving Horse taken in the 1960s"

Amusement parks in New Jersey
Buildings and structures in Atlantic City, New Jersey
Historic American Engineering Record in New Jersey
1898 establishments in New Jersey
1993 establishments in New Jersey
Piers in New Jersey
Tourist attractions in Atlantic County, New Jersey